Lone Pine Peak is located on the east side of the Sierra Nevada range just west of the town of Lone Pine, California in Inyo County, in eastern California in the southwestern United States. The summit marks the eastern boundary of the John Muir Wilderness in the Inyo National Forest. Lone Pine Peak is the mountain in the photo for the default desktop of macOS Sierra.

References 

Mountains of Inyo County, California
Mountains of the Sierra Nevada (United States)
Mountains of the John Muir Wilderness
Mountains of Northern California